The United Anglican Church is a small American Continuing Anglican denomination formed in 2002 through the merger of the Traditional Episcopal Church (TEC) and the Anglo-Catholic Church in the Americas (ACTA). It has parishes in Pennsylvania, Delaware, and Virginia. It also sponsors the Laud Hall Theological Seminary as an institution for theological education. The bishop of the United Anglican Church's Eastern Diocese is the Right Rev. Barry Yingling, CSSS. Its headquarters is in York, Pennsylvania.

External links 
Diocese of the East
Diocese of the West

External links 
Official website
United Anglican Church Province II
Ecclesiastical Heraldry for the United Anglican Church

Continuing Anglican denominations
Christian denominations established in the 21st century
Anglo-Catholicism
Anglican denominations in North America
Christian organizations established in 2002